The Evenk Ethnic Sum is an administrative subdivision in the northeastern part of Old Barag Banner in Hulunbuir, Inner Mongolia.

, it is the only ethnic sum in China; the sum is a type of administrative unit in China at the township (fourth) level only found in Inner Mongolia, equivalent to ethnic townships in other parts of China.

See also
Evenks
Sum (administrative division)
Administrative divisions of the People's Republic of China

References

Township-level divisions of Inner Mongolia
Evenks
Ethnic townships of the People's Republic of China
Hulunbuir